The pallid-winged grasshopper (Trimerotropis pallidipennis) is a common grasshopper of the family Acrididae, native to the deserts of western North America along with South America, ranging from British Columbia to Argentina. They are more active during the summer months, and their pale, mottled coloration makes them hard to see against surfaces such as the granite often found in the gravel of dry river beds. They grow to be .

Populations of the pallid-winged grasshopper occasionally irrupt to damaging numbers. Between 1952 and 1980, there were six outbreaks in Arizona, only one of which lasted more than one year.

References

Oedipodinae
Orthoptera of North America
Insects of South America
Insects described in 1838